The 2003 German Grand Prix (formally the Grosser Mobil 1 Preis von Deutschland 2003) was a Formula One motor race held on 3 August 2003 at the Hockenheimring, Hockenheim, Germany. It was the twelfth race of the 2003 Formula One season and the sixty-fifth German Grand Prix. The 67-lap race was won by Juan Pablo Montoya driving for the Williams team after starting from pole position. David Coulthard finished second in a McLaren car, with Jarno Trulli third in a Renault.

Report

Friday drivers 
The 3 teams in the 2003 Constructors' Championship had the right to drive a third car on Friday that were involved in additional training. These drivers did not compete in qualifying or the race.

Race
Montoya's victory promoted him to second place in the Drivers' Championship, after McLaren driver Kimi Räikkönen retired from a collision on the first lap of the race. Montoya also reduced the gap from Championship leader Michael Schumacher to six points. Williams reduced the gap to Ferrari in the Constructors Championship to two points.

Classification

Qualifying

Race

Championship standings after the race 
Bold text indicates who still has a theoretical chance of becoming World Champion.

Drivers' Championship standings

Constructors' Championship standings

Note: Only the top five positions are included for both sets of standings.

References

German Grand Prix
Grand Prix
German Grand Prix
August 2003 sports events in Europe